Modeste may refer to:

 Modeste (name), including a list of people with the name
 French ship Modeste (1759), a 64-gun ship of the line of the French Navy
 French ship Modeste, list of French ships with this name
 HMS Modeste, list of British ships with this name
 Modeste (comic character), a Belgian comic character

See also

 Modest (disambiguation)
 Modesty
 St. Modeste